Christopher Rydell (born November 16, 1963) is an American former actor. The son of film director Mark Rydell and actress Joanne Linville, Rydell is best known for his starring role in Dario Argento's Trauma and for his role as Danny Leonard in the musical film For the Boys. He has appeared in a number of his father's films, including Harry and Walter Go to New York and On Golden Pond.

Rydell starred in the film Queen of the Lot.

Filmography

References

External links

1963 births
20th-century American male actors
American male film actors
Place of birth missing (living people)
Living people